Artem Hermanovych Tsurupin (born 16 July 1992) is a Ukrainian professional footballer who plays as a central midfielder for Ukrainian club Kramatorsk.

References

External links
 
 
 

1992 births
Living people
Footballers from Kyiv
Ukrainian footballers
Association football midfielders
FC Ros Bila Tserkva players
FC SKAD-Yalpuh Bolhrad players
SC Chaika Petropavlivska Borshchahivka players
FC Arsenal Kyiv players
NK Veres Rivne players
FC Hirnyk-Sport Horishni Plavni players
FC Myr Hornostayivka players
FC Cherkashchyna players
FC Rubikon Kyiv players
FC Olimpik Donetsk players
FC Kramatorsk players
Ukrainian First League players
Ukrainian Second League players
Ukrainian Amateur Football Championship players
Ukrainian expatriate footballers
Expatriate footballers in Poland
Ukrainian expatriate sportspeople in Poland